Muhsin Yazıcıoğlu (December 31, 1954 – March 25, 2009) was a Turkish politician and member of the Parliament of Turkey. He was the leader and founder of the Great Union Party (BBP), a right-wing, nationalist-Islamist political party.

Biography
Yazıcıoğlu was born 1954 in a small village named Elmalı in Şarkışla of Sivas Province. He studied in Şarkışla from primary school to high school after that he was educated at the Faculty of Veterinary Medicine in Ankara University. He was a member of Grey Wolves struggling for nationalism during the 1970s. After 1980 Turkish coup d'état, he was arrested for being one of the leaders of Grey Wolves. He stayed for 7 years in prison. After the years of imprisonment, he was released in 1987 by being cleared of blame. In the following years, he involved in politics under Nationalist Movement Party. In 1991, he and some of his fellows left this movement and established a new political party called Great Union Party next year.

His party has been represented in the Parliament only via electoral coalitions with popular parties. At the 2002 legislative elections, the party won 1.1% of the popular vote and no seats; in the 2007 elections Muhsin Yazıcıoğlu was elected as an independent.

Yazıcıoğlu died on March 25, 2009, in a helicopter crash in the southern Turkish province of Kahramanmaraş, after a political rally there on the way to the next rally in Yozgat just four days before the local elections. He received a state funeral to which most of the party leaders attended. Thousands of people joined his funeral ceremony in Kocatepe Mosque in Ankara. After his death, in the 2009 local elections the BBP's candidate was elected as the new mayor of Sivas.

Controversies surrounding death 

After the helicopter crash, journalist Ismail Güneş who was one of the passengers, called the Turkish emergency service number 112 and was able to talk to the dispatcher clearly. He explained how the helicopter fell in a way which made some people believe that the crash was more of an assassination than an accident. According to Ismail Güneş's autopsy his chin was broken after the crash, suggesting he wouldn't have been able to talk to the dispatcher. Locals and soldiers searched for the corpses for 48 hours until the bodies were found.

A Turkish magazine called Aksiyon Magazine also published a special file on the blood of the deceased that there was carbon monoxide before the helicopter fell. According to Köksal Akpınar, it was proven that the carbon monoxide values in the blood of pilot Kaya İstekte and journalist İsmail Güneş were much higher when the helicopter was falling.

There is a tape illustrating Sergeant Aydın Özsıcak dismantling the GPS of the helicopter. This tape was denied by the then-Turkish prime minister Recep Tayyip Erdoğan. However, after the failed military coup in 2016, President Erdoğan published the video since Aydın Özsıcak was one of the sergeants who tried to overthrow Erdoğan during the coup. Today, the reason for the accident still remains a mystery.

References 

1954 births
2009 deaths
People from Şarkışla
Turkish Sunni Muslims
Turkish veterinarians
Great Unity Party politicians
Deputies of Sivas
Grey Wolves (organization) members
Leaders of political parties in Turkey
Victims of helicopter accidents or incidents
Victims of aviation accidents or incidents in Turkey
Members of the 23rd Parliament of Turkey
Members of the 20th Parliament of Turkey